The Sandy City Bank, at 212 E. Main St. in Sandy, Utah, was built in 1907.  It includes Late 19th and 20th Century Revivals and Italian Renaissance architecture.  It was listed on the National Register of Historic Places in 1997.

It is an example of Italian Renaissance Revival style architecture, also known as Second Renaissance Revival, in the area of Sandy City.

In 1997 it was no longer a bank, and instead was a day care facility.

References

Buildings and structures in Sandy, Utah
Bank buildings on the National Register of Historic Places in Utah
Historic district contributing properties in Utah
National Register of Historic Places in Salt Lake County, Utah
Banks established in 1907
Commercial buildings completed in 1907
1907 establishments in Utah
Italian Renaissance Revival architecture in the United States
Second Renaissance Revival architecture